Pansy is an unincorporated community in Grant County, West Virginia, USA.

References

Unincorporated communities in Grant County, West Virginia
Unincorporated communities in West Virginia